Ashok Roy (1936–2007) was an Indian born musician based in Australia. Described as a "world class performer and inspiring teacher" Roy played the sarod. His solo album The Night Ragas was nominated at the ARIA Music Awards of 1997 for Best World Music Album.

Roy was the head of music department at The Doon School, an independent all-boys' school in Dehradun from 1977 till 1988.

Discography

Albums

Awards and nominations

ARIA Music Awards
The ARIA Music Awards is an annual awards ceremony that recognises excellence, innovation, and achievement across all genres of Australian music. They commenced in 1987.

! 
|-
| 1997
| The Night Ragas
| ARIA Award for Best World Music Album
| 
| 
|-

References

1936 births
2007 deaths
The Doon School faculty